Allik is an Estonian surname meaning "water source" or "spring". Notable people with the surname include:
Hendrik Allik (1901–1989), Estonian communist politician 
Jaak Allik (born 1946), Estonian politician and theatre director
Johanna Allik (born 1994), Estonian figure skater
Jüri Allik, (born 1949),  Estonian psychologist
Kristi Allik (born 1952), Canadian music educator and composer
Peeter Allik (1966–2019), Estonian artist

See also
Allika (disambiguation)
Alliku (disambiguation)

References

Estonian-language surnames